Shokurchi (also Romanized as Shokūrchī; also known as Shokorchī) is a village in Chaypareh-ye Pain Rural District, Zanjanrud District, Zanjan County, Zanjan Province, Iran. At the 2006 census, its population was 251, in 59 families.

References 

Populated places in Zanjan County